The Municipal District of Bighorn No. 8 is a municipal district (MD) situated in Census Division No. 15 of Alberta, Canada. It is located between Calgary and Banff National Park, north of Kananaskis Improvement District. Highway 1 (the Trans-Canada Highway) passes through the municipal district.

It was created as a municipal district on January 1, 1988 from the former Improvement District No. 8. The Town of Canmore lies adjacent to the municipal district to the southwest.

Communities and localities 
The following urban municipalities are surrounded by the MD of Bighorn No. 8.
Cities
none
Towns
Canmore
Villages
none
Summer villages
Ghost Lake
Waiparous

The following hamlets are located within the MD of Bighorn No. 8.
Hamlets
Benchlands
Dead Man's Flats or Pigeon Mountain (designated place)
Exshaw
Harvie Heights
Lac des Arcs

The following localities are located within the MD of Bighorn No. 8.
Localities 
Gap
Improvement District No. 8
Jumping Pound (Forest Res)
Kananaskis
Spray Lakes

Demographics 

In the 2016 Census of Population conducted by Statistics Canada, the MD of Bighorn No. 8 had a population of 1,334 living in 556 of its 766 total private dwellings, a  change from its 2011 population of 1,341.

See also 
List of communities in Alberta
List of municipal districts in Alberta

References

External links 

 
Bighorn